Brian Ebenezer Adjei Brobbey (born 1 February 2002) is a Dutch professional footballer who plays as a striker for Eredivisie club Ajax.

Club career

Early career
Brobbey began his youth career with AFC before joining  the Ajax academy in 2010.

Ajax
Brobbey made his Ajax debut in the Eredivisie on 31 October 2020, coming on as a substitute and scoring in a 5–2 victory over Fortuna Sittard. He made his European debut in the group stage of the UEFA Champions League against Atalanta on 9 December 2020 and his performance was praised by coach Erik ten Hag.

On 3 February 2021, Ajax director of football Marc Overmars, confirmed that Brobbey would leave the club at the expiry of his contract at the end of the season. Brobbey scored his first goal in a European competition on 18 February, netting Ajax's second goal in their Europa League round of 32 first leg away win over Lille.

RB Leipzig 
On 12 March 2021, RB Leipzig announced the signing of Brobbey. He joined them on 1 July 2021.

Return to Ajax on loan
On 27 December 2021, it was announced that Brobbey would return to Ajax on a six-month loan spell without an option to buy. He was assigned shirt number 18, previously worn that season by Jurgen Ekkelenkamp. He made his first appearance on 16 January 2022 in an away match against FC Utrecht as the starting striker, securing two goals before being substituted-off in the 70th minute for Davy Klaassen in a 3–0 victory.

Return to Ajax 
On 22 July 2022, Ajax confirmed the re-signing of Brian Brobbey on a five-year contract for a fee of €16.35 million plus €3 million in potential add ons.

International career
Born in the Netherlands, Brobbey is of Ghanaian descent. Brobbey represented the Netherlands U17 at both the 2018 and 2019 editions of the UEFA European Under-17 Championship, winning both competitions respectively.

In October 2022, Brobbey was included in the preliminary squad for the 2022 FIFA World Cup.

Personal life 
He is a younger brother of fellow football player  Samuel Brobbey and cousin to Derrick Luckassen and Kevin Luckassen.

Career statistics

Club

Honours
Ajax
 Eredivisie: 2020–21, 2021–22
 KNVB Cup: 2020–21

Netherlands U17
UEFA European Under-17 Championship: 2018, 2019
Individual

 Eredivisie Talent of the Month: May 2022, August 2022, October 2022

References

2002 births
Living people
Dutch sportspeople of Ghanaian descent
Footballers from Amsterdam
Dutch footballers
Association football forwards
Netherlands youth international footballers
Eerste Divisie players
Eredivisie players
Bundesliga players
Amsterdamsche FC players
Jong Ajax players
AFC Ajax players
RB Leipzig players
Dutch expatriate footballers
Dutch expatriate sportspeople in Germany
Expatriate footballers in Germany